Yegor Ilyich Titov (born 29 May 1976) is a Russian football coach and a former player who played as a midfielder. He was a goal scoring midfielder who usually played in "the hole" between the midfield and attack, as an attacking midfielder. As a playmaker, he was well known for his vision, close control and accurate passing. Other than that he was a renowned set-piece taker and is well known for his temperament.

Career
Born in Moscow, Titov spent the majority of his club career at Spartak Moscow, starting in 1995, helping them to six consecutive league titles, and winning Russian Player of the Year in 1998 and 2000. He played for Russia at the 2002 World Cup and has amassed over 30 caps for his country. After a Euro 2004 playoff against Wales he was tested positive for the banned substance bromantan and received a 12-month suspension. Later, former Spartak players Maksim Demenko and Vladyslav Vashchuk along with physio Artyom Katulin blamed Katulin's assistant Anatoly Schukin, who allegedly acted on behalf of manager Andrey Chernyshov. In 2008, Titov had made similar statements in his interview to Sovetsky Sport. After the ban, he has continued playing for Spartak and has been a major figure for the club when Spartak managed to finish 2nd in the 2005, 2006 and 2007 seasons, thus qualifying for the Champions League.

In 2002, Titov was reportedly close to a move to La Liga side Atlético Madrid, but eventually decided against joining the Spanish outfit.

Titov, who was just several years ago was considered one of Russia's key players stopped playing for the team when he refused to be called up for a Euro 2008 qualifying match against Estonia, saying the reason was because his wife was pregnant and he wants to spend more time with her.

Due to several factors, including a recent severe loss of form and conflicts with Spartak Moscow's manager, Titov became unsettled and, in August 2008, left to join FC Khimki.

In the beginning of 2009, Yegor signed with the newly formed club Lokomotiv Astana. He joined the Kazakh side with his former teammate Andrey Tikhonov.

He retired from professional football in early 2010. In early 2012, he played several games for FC Arsenal Tula which played in the fourth-tier Russian Amateur Football League at the time and was managed by his former Spartak and Russia teammate Dmitri Alenichev. Alenichev hired him as his assistant when he was hired as the manager of FC Spartak Moscow in the summer of 2015.

Career statistics

Club

International

International goals
Scores and results list Russia's goal tally first.

Honours

Club 
Spartak Moscow
Russian Premier League (6): 1996, 1997, 1998, 1999, 2000, 2001
Russian Cup (2): 1997–98, 2002–03

Individual 
CIS Cup top goalscorer: 2000 (shared)

References

External links
 Egor Titov's unofficial website 
 Club profile 
 Profile and interview 
 – Yegor leaves Spartak

1976 births
Living people
Doping cases in association football
Russian footballers
Russia international footballers
Russia under-21 international footballers
Russian sportspeople in doping cases
FC Spartak Moscow players
2002 FIFA World Cup players
Footballers from Moscow
FC Astana players
Association football midfielders
Russian Premier League players
FC Khimki players
FC Arsenal Tula players
Russian expatriate footballers
Expatriate footballers in Kazakhstan
Russian expatriate sportspeople in Kazakhstan